The 24th Minesweeping Flotilla was a minesweeping flotilla of the Royal Australian Navy. It was based at Darwin, Northern Territory during the Second World War and consisted of HMAS Deloraine, Katoomba, Lithgow and later Armidale.

Notes

References

History of the Royal Australian Navy